There are a total of 125 public Carnegie libraries in Canada. Of these, the vast majority (111) were built in Ontario. They were constructed and opened from 1903 to 1922. Place names as they were during the grant period are used. In a few cases, Carnegie made multiple donations. An attempt is made to note these and sum the total amount. In addition, one academic library was built for Victoria University in the University of Toronto by architect Henry Sproatt, from a $50,000 grant awarded April 16, 1906.


Alphabetical listing

References

Further reading 

Canada
Carnegie libraries